A Song for All Seasons is the eighth studio album by the English progressive rock band Renaissance, released in 1978. It marked the return of electric guitars to the band's music after several years of absence. "Northern Lights" from the album reached the top ten on the UK Singles Chart and is the band's only UK chart single.

Overview

A shortened recording of "Back Home Once Again" was used as the theme song for the short-lived 1977 British TV series The Paper Lads.

"She Is Love", sung by Jon Camp, was meant to be sung by Annie Haslam, but the orchestral backing track turned out to have been recorded in the wrong key for her.

Drummer Terry Sullivan had his first songwriting credit with the band on the title track. He was responsible for the basic tune to the song's extended instrumental intro. This was based on a song he wrote on guitar in 1971.

Expanded 2019 edition
In  2019 Esoteric Recordings announced a re-mastered and 3 CD expanded edition of the album which was released on 29 March 2019.

Track listing

Personnel

Renaissance
Annie Haslam – lead vocals on tracks 1–3, 5, 7, 8
Michael Dunford – 6 & 12-string acoustic guitars, electric guitar
John Tout – keyboards
Jon Camp – bass, bass pedals, electric guitar, lead vocals on tracks 4 and 6
Terence Sullivan – drums, percussion

Additional musicians
Royal Philharmonic Orchestra
Harry Rabinowitz – conductor, arrangements on track 6
Louis Clark – orchestral arrangements

Production
David Hentschel – producer, engineer
Barry Kidd, Declan O'Doherty, Dick Plant, Steve Short – assistant engineers
Hipgnosis – album cover design

Charts

Album

Singles

Certifications

References

1978 albums
Renaissance (band) albums
Albums produced by David Hentschel
Albums with cover art by Hipgnosis
Sire Records albums
Warner Records albums